Orodes I  (also spelled Urud I;  Wērōd/Urūd), was king of the Parthian Empire from 80 to 75 BC. He was the son and heir of Gotarzes I. His reign is relatively obscure. His throne may have been usurped in 87–80 BC by his supposed uncle Mithridates III, however, this has found little support in scholarship. Of his military activities, it is known that Orodes I re-established Parthian rule in Elymais in 78 BC, which had been independent since 81/80 BC. Orodes I later lost the throne to the aged Parthian prince Sinatruces, who belonged to a different branch of the royal Arsacid family.

Name 
Orōdēs is the Greek attestation of the Middle Iranian name Wērōd/Urūd. The etymology of the name is disputed. The Modern Persian version is Viru.

Biography 
Orodes was the son and heir of Parthian king Gotarzes I. Rahim M. Shayegan (2011) has suggested that Orodes was one of the figures depicted on the rock relief of Gotarzes I at Mount Behistun. Orodes' mother may have been the Armenian queen Ariazate, who was a daughter of Tigranes the Great.

According to Gholamreza F. Assar (2006), after the death of Gotarzes I in 87 BC, his brother Mithridates III usurped the throne from Orodes. In August/September 80 BC, Mithridates III was dethroned in Babylon, and was shortly afterwards expelled from Susa by Orodes. Mithridates III may have survived this event and managed to flee to the north, where he continued fighting until he died the following year. Other scholars, however, do not support the existence of a Mithridates III ruling in the 80s BC. According to Shayegan, the existence of rival kings such as Mithridates III during this period "repose primarily upon numismatic evidence, may find scant support in the literary and documentary sources, and can be contradicted by a diverging interpretation of the period's coinage."

Orodes I reigned during a period coined in scholarship as the "Parthian Dark Age," which refers to a period of three decades in the history of Parthian Empire starting from the death (or last years) of Mithridates II. It is referred to as a "Dark Age" due to the lack of clear information on the events of this period in the empire, except a series of, apparently overlapping, reigns. The majority of Orodes I's coins were minted in Ecbatana and Rhagae in central Iran. He is mentioned as king of the Arsacid dynasty in a Babylonian report of the lunar eclipse of 11 April 80 BC. Babylonian chronicles also made mention of his sister-queen, Ispubarza. It is unknown if they were full siblings; marriage with half-siblings was not considered incestuous amongst the members of the Iranian Achaemenid dynasty. It is uncertain if the Parthians continued the same practice of half-sibling marriage, due to lack of convincing documentation. While Orodes I's grandfather, Mithridates II, used the title of King of Kings, it remains uncertain whether he himself used the title or not. It is however certain that he used the titles of Great King and Arsaces. Under Gotarzes I and Orodes I, Babylonian scholars notably wrote cuneiform records in the same method that had been done in era of the Achaemenid Empire. According to Shayegan, this was done to emphasize the association of the Parthians with their Achaemenid predecessors.

The kingdom of Elymais in south-western Iran had since 124 BC been under complete Parthian control. However, in 81/80 BC, coins of king Kamnaskires III and his wife Anzaze appears, which indicates that the kingdom had been restored. According to Babylonian sources, Orodes I launched an expedition into Elymais in 78 BC, where he defeated Kamnaskires III. Kamnaskires III was not deposed, however, and continued ruling the kingdom, now as a Parthian vassal. An aged Parthian prince named Sinatruces, who originally resided amongst the Saka of Central Asia, enlisted their aid, and captured the Parthian throne in  BC, thus succeeding Orodes I. Unlike Orodes I, Sinatruces was not a descendant of Mithridates II. Sinatruces thus ousted the line of Mithridates II with his own; the name of the Arsacid branch established by Sinatruces on the Parthian throne has been coined by the modern historian Marek Jan Olbrycht as the "Sinatrucids", which ruled the Parthian Empire till 12 AD. The Sinatrucid family was notably supported by the Suren clan of Sakastan.

Notes

References

Sources
 
 
 
 
 
 
 
  
  
 
  
 

1st-century BC Parthian monarchs
Year of birth unknown
Parthian Dark Age
1st-century BC Babylonian kings